The 2018 Laurie O'Reilly Cup was the 11th edition of the competition. The matches were played on 18 and 25 August with both New Zealand and Australia playing hosts to each other.

The first test occurred in Sydney at the ANZ Stadium; The Black Ferns won the match 31–11 which increased their winning streak to 16. New Zealand dominated the Wallaroos in the second test with a 45–17 victory which saw them retain the Cup and clinch the series.

Table

Fixtures

Game 1

Game 2

Broadcast 
The matches were broadcast live in New Zealand on SKY TV.

References 

Laurie O'Reilly Cup
Australia women's national rugby union team
New Zealand women's national rugby union team
Laurie O'Reilly Cup
Laurie O'Reilly Cup